Prapetno is a settlement on the left bank of the Soča River, southeast of Tolmin, in the Littoral region of Slovenia.

References

External links
Prapetno on Geopedia

Populated places in the Municipality of Tolmin